Raipur is a Tehsil in  Jhalawar district in the Indian state of Rajasthan.

Geography

References

Cities and towns in Jhalawar district